William Boyd III (born 1968 or 1969) is an American politician who has served as a member of the New Hampshire House of Representatives since 2021, representing Hillsborough County's 21st district, which contains the town of Merrimack. A member of the Republican Party, Boyd ran in an April 2021 special election to succeed Dick Hinch, who died of COVID-19 in December 2020. Boyd defeated the Democratic nominee, former state representative Wendy E.N. Thomas, by a margin of 2,531 votes to 2,144. Boyd's campaign was assisted by Mike Pompeo, a former United States secretary of state, and Tom Cotton, a United States senator from Arkansas.

Boyd previously served on the Merrimack Town Council and the New Hampshire Drinking and Groundwater Advisory Commission.

References 

Date of birth missing (living people)
Place of birth missing (living people)
Republican Party members of the New Hampshire House of Representatives
People from Merrimack, New Hampshire
21st-century American politicians
Year of birth uncertain
1960s births
Living people